Jess Steele,  is the founder and director of Jericho Road Solutions and a community activist in Hastings. Steele was a founder trustee of Hastings Pier & White Rock Trust  which successfully campaigned to transfer the pier into community ownership  and raised £14m for its renovation.

Background 

Jess Steele was born in the United Kingdom and lives and works in Hastings where she played a leading role in the saving of Hastings Pier.

Career

Steele founded the creative outreach charity Magpie and led the ‘Get Set for Citizenship’ program. Recruited to the National Community Forum in 2001, she saw the power of local-to-local networking and joined the British Urban Regeneration Association as Deputy Chief Executive in 2004, responsible for training, events and best practice awards.

At the Development Trusts Association from 2007, Steele established its practitioner consultancy service, the Pool, drawing on the expertise of the development trusts movement to offer support on community enterprise and community assets. Later she became one of two Directors of Innovation for Locality. In 2013 Steele wrote the People's Pier report, which was published by the trade association Co-operatives UK on 26 August 2013.

Steele established Jericho Road Solutions in May 2013, and has supported 25 groups of local people across the country to tackle challenging buildings, including coordinating the CADO (Community Assets in Difficult Ownership) program, establishing a “crowdlending” invcentive, allowing residents put in cash to buy buildings and land to keep them community-owned and permanently affordable, as well as providing long-term coaching to a range of neighborhood clients on community engagement, social investment, organizational development and property acquisition. These include building projects in Liverpool, Manchester, Halifax, Sheffield, London, Bristol, Coventry, Bognor, Portsmouth, Folkestone, Hastings, Flimwell and the Isle of Wight. Steele is also a community business panel member for the Power to Change Trust.

As a director of White Rock Trust, Steele brought together the partnership White Rock Neighborhood Ventures to redevelop Rock House - a live-work space for local creative people and businesses, which has capped rents, and is coordinating an emerging Community Land Trust to tackle the threat of gentrification. A further project, still ongoing is to bring the F.J. Parsons Printworks (Observer Building) back to life.

References

British activists
British women activists
Living people
Year of birth missing (living people)